Begonia schaeferi is a species of plant in the family Begoniaceae. It is found in Cameroon and Nigeria. Its natural habitats are subtropical or tropical moist montane forests and rocky areas. It is threatened by habitat loss.

References

schaeferi
Vulnerable plants
Taxonomy articles created by Polbot
Taxa named by Adolf Engler